Bae Bien-u (born May 22, 1950) is a South Korean photographer. He is a professor in Seoul Institute of the Arts.

Early life and career
Bae was born in Suncheon and grew up in Yeosu, Jeollanam-do in 1950, and graduated from Hongik University's College of Arts in 1974 and the graduate school of the same university in 1976.

Renowned as a professional photographer with themes especially concentrated on pine trees, he has become a representative photographer with the reputation of capturing the characteristic sentiments of Korea including the pine trees, oceans and mountains with his camera rather than a brush.

He became better-known outside of South Korea after selling one of his pine tree photographs to English singer Elton John in 2005. Former South Korean president Lee Myung-bak later gave a collection of Bae's pine tree photographs to U.S. president Barack Obama during a summit held in Washington.

He served as professor of the Department of Photography at Seoul Institute of the Arts.

Selected solo exhibitions
Some of his solo exhibitions are listed below:
 2008: Sacred Wood, BOZAR - Palais des Beaux-Arts de Bruxelles, Brussels
 2009: Sacred Wood, Aando Fine Art, Berlin
 2009: Sacred Wood, Galerie zur Stockeregg, Zurich
 2009: Soul Garden, National Museum of Modern and Contemporary Art Korea - Deoksugung, Seoul
 2011: ConvexConcave, Axel Vervoordt Gallery, Antwerpen
 2012: Windscape, Aando Fine Art, Berlin
 2012: Windscape, Christophe Guye Galerie, Zurich
 2014: Counterbalance, Axel Vervoordt Gallery, Antwerp
 2015: Dans un forêt l’autre, Château de Chambord, Domain national de Chambord
 2016: Bae Bien-U -分合 Part:Meet, Axel Vervoordt Gallery, Hong Kong
 2016: Bae Bien-U - L'Esprit du Lieu, Musée de la Mer, Cannes

Collections of photographs
 To live in a thickly forested mountain (청산에 살어리랏다), 2005, 
 Changdeokgung (창덕궁), 2009,

References

External links
 Korea Digital Archives for the Arts "Bae Bien-U (배병우)" 
 "Bae Bien-u Exhibit" Naver

1950 births
Living people
People from Yeosu
Hongik University alumni
Academic staff of Seoul Institute of the Arts
South Korean photographers